The New Zealand Gazette, commonly referred to as Gazette, is the official newspaper of record (government gazette) of the New Zealand Government. Published since 1840, it is the longest-running publication in New Zealand. Since 26 October 2017, it has been published online continuously. Special editions are also published twice a year to cover the New Year Honours and King's Birthday Honours.

History
The first issue was published as Gazette Extraordinary on 30 December 1840. Then it was the New Zealand Government Gazette from 1841 to 1847. Between 1847 and 1853 it was split into the New Zealand Government Gazette, Province of New Ulster for New Ulster (the North Island), published in Auckland, and the New Zealand Government Gazette, Province of New Munster for New Munster (the South Island), published in Wellington. In 1853 the two were reunited as the New Zealand Government Gazette and it changed to its present title on 11 August 1857.

In 2014, the online edition of the Gazette became the official version while a print edition is still available for subscription.

Up until 26 October 2017, it is published every Thursday, and a Customs Edition was published each Tuesday. It had been produced weekly, except over the Christmas/New Year period, since 1841.

See also
New Zealand official publications

Notes

External links

Newspapers published in New Zealand
Government of New Zealand
Government gazettes
Publications established in 1841
1841 establishments in New Zealand
British colonial gazettes